Guiller Asido is the 10th and incumbent administrator of the Intramuros Administration, an attached agency of the Department of Tourism mandated with the authority to restore and guide the development of Intramuros, Manila. He was previously the chief operating officer of the Tourism Infrastructure and Enterprise Zone Authority.

He earned the following degrees from the University of Santo Tomas in Manila: BA in literature, Bachelor of Laws, and Master of Laws (cum laude). He is also at present a professor of law at the Adamson University College of Law, Bulacan State University College of Law and San Beda College College of Arts and Sciences' Department of Legal Management, handling subjects such as commercial law review, banking and insurance law and
special commercial laws.

References

Year of birth missing (living people)
Living people
Department of Tourism (Philippines)
People from Intramuros
University of Santo Tomas alumni